Desmond Mokgobu (born 23 November 1988) is a male South African long-distance runner. He competed in the marathon event at the 2015 World Championships in Athletics in Beijing, China, finishing 41st. In the following World Championships, held in London in 2017, he completed the marathon in 2:16:14, ranking in the 21st place.

See also
 South Africa at the 2015 World Championships in Athletics
 South Africa at the 2017 World Championships in Athletics

References

External links
 

1988 births
Living people
Place of birth missing (living people)
South African male long-distance runners
South African male marathon runners
World Athletics Championships athletes for South Africa
Athletes (track and field) at the 2020 Summer Olympics
Olympic male marathon runners
Olympic athletes of South Africa